The 2000 Saint Francis Cougars football team represented the University of Saint Francis, located in Fort Wayne, Indiana, in the 2000 NAIA football season. They were led by head coach Kevin Donley, who served his 3rd year as the first and only head coach in the history of Saint Francis football.  The Cougars played their home games at Cougar Stadium and were members of the Mid-States Football Association (MSFA) Mideast League (MEL). The Cougars finished in 1st place in the MSFA MEL division, receiving an automatic bid to the 2000 postseason NAIA playoffs.

Schedule 
(10-2 overall, 6-0 conference)

Ranking movements

References

Saint Francis
Saint Francis Cougars football seasons
Saint Francis Cougars football